Basse Santa Su, usually known as Basse, is a town in the Gambia, lying on the south bank of the River Gambia. The easternmost major town in the nation, it known for its important market. Basse is the capital of the Upper River Division, which is coterminous with the Basse Local Government Area. As of 2009, the town has an estimated population of 18,414. According to the 2013 census, the Basse LGA has 243,791 residents.

A bridge over the Gambia river, funded by the Chinese government, opened in October 2021.

Climate
Basse Santa Su has a tropical savanna climate (Köppen Aw), almost dry enough to be a hot semi-arid climate (BSh) with no rainfall from November to May and heavy rainfall from June to October.

Gallery

References

Upper River Division
Local Government Areas of the Gambia
Populated places in the Gambia
Gambia River